Shopsy's is a Jewish delicatessen restaurant chain in the Greater Toronto Area and a brand name owned by Maple Leaf Foods for a line of meat products.

History
In 1921, the husband-and-wife team of Harry Shopsowitz and Jenny Shopsowitz opened an 18-seat ice cream parlour at 295 Spadina Avenue at Dundas Street West in Toronto. It became Shopsowitz Delicatessen and by the mid-1940s was selling products under the Shopsy's brand name.

Harry died in October 1945 and the business was passed along to his sons, Sam Shopsowitz and Izzy Shopsowitz. They led its growth into a Toronto institution, renaming the business Shopsy's. Future Toronto Maple Leafs owner Harold Ballard is said to have been the person who encouraged Sam to open a meat-processing plant. By 1947, Sam was being billed as "the corned beef king" in advertisements.

Izzy sold his share of the business to Sam in 1969 and Lever Brothers (part of Unilever) bought the company in December 1971. Sam suffered a stroke in 1982 and died in September 1984 at age 63. After 62 years on Spadina, the restaurant moved to Yonge Street at Front Street in March 1983. Izzy died in April 1994 at age 71 after having a heart attack while in the Shopsy's restaurant. He had rejoined the business after the sale to Unilever. The Front Street location has been described as a "landmark for more than 25 years."

In 1992, Unilever sold the manufacturing division to Maple Leaf Foods. The restaurant business—Shopsy's Hospitality Incorporated—was managed by A&W for a period in the 1990s, and then bought in 1996 by a group headed by Lewis Allen. He was CEO until leaving in 2003. As of 2005, Shopsy's Hospitality was owned by Dynamic Funds.

In 2006, Irish Embassy Hospitality Group bought Shopsy's restaurant. Shopy's Deli corporate offices are located at 51 Yonge Street (and Wellington Street East), just north of Irish Embassy Pub & Grill.

In 2008, the lease at Yonge and Front was not renewed  by the landlord  and Shopsy's closed. In December 2009, the restaurant re-opened in the Sheraton Centre at 96 Richmond Street West in Toronto. Previous other locations include Markham, Ontario, Toronto Island, and a Shopsy's Express Kiosk at the Rogers Centre.

Meat products

 Hot dogs

 Corned beef
 Salami
 Pastrami
 Pastrami Sticks / Jerky
 Smoked meat

Delicatessen
Current locations:
 Downtown Toronto, 96 Richmond West, Toronto (in the Sheraton Centre)
 Shopsy's York Lanes Mall, York University, 4700 Keele Street, Toronto
 
Previous locations:
 Spadina Avenue at Dundas Street West (1921–1983) –burned down in fire
 Yonge Street north of St. Clair Avenue (1998–2005) – now a pub
 King Street West at John Street, Toronto (1994–2003) – sold to Dunn's Famous (now closed)
 Yonge Street at Front Street, Toronto (1983–2009) – lease expired by court ruling
 Mississauga Road and Derry Road, Mississauga (2004–2010) – lease expired
 Shopsy's Express at the Rogers Centre
 Shopsy's Deli Woodbine and Steeles
 Shopsy's Centre Island – Toronto Islands
 Shopsy's Sports Bar on the Danforth

See also

 List of delicatessens

References

Further reading

External links
 Shopsy's Deli
 Shopsy's
 Irish Embassy Hospitality Group

Hot dog restaurants
Jewish delicatessens in Canada
Jews and Judaism in Toronto
Kosher style restaurants
Restaurants in Toronto
Meat companies of Canada